Kastamonu Spor Kulübü was a Turkish football club founded in 1966. The club was located in Kastamonu, Turkey.

History 
Kastamonuspor began to compete at the second level in the 1967 – 1968 season. They was relegated to the amateur level following the 1976 – 1977 season. The team returned to professional leagues by promoting TFF Third League in the 1984 – 1985 season. The team advanced to the TFF Second League promotion playoffs in the both 2007 – 2008 and 2008 – 2009 season but failed to promote second league. In 2012 – 2013 season Kastamonuspor relegated to  Regional Amateur League. In the next season, 2013 – 2014 they relegated once again to Kastamonu First Amateur League. At the start of the next season Kastamonuspor decided to merge with another team from Kastamonu,  Tosya Belediyespor that advanced Regional Amateur League in the previous season. In November 2014 Kastamonuspor withdrew from league and dissolved.

Stadium 
Kastamonuspor played their home games at  Gazi Stadium.

References

Football clubs in Turkey
1966 establishments in Turkey
Sport in Kastamonu
Association football clubs established in 1966